Morozov is a rural locality (a khutor) in Melovatskoye Rural Settlement, Kalacheyevsky District, Voronezh Oblast, Russia. The population was 73 as of 2010.

Geography 
Morozov is located 19 km west of Kalach (the district's administrative centre) by road. Novomelovatka is the nearest rural locality.

References 

Rural localities in Kalacheyevsky District